Tinemu or Tinamu may refer to:
 Tinemu-ye Olya
 Tinemu-ye Sofla